This is a list of fugitives from justice, notable people who disappeared or evaded capture while being sought by law enforcement agencies in connection with a crime, and who are currently sought or were sought for the duration of their presumed natural lifetime. Listing here does not imply guilt and may include persons who are or were wanted only for questioning.

Before 1800

19th century

1900s

1910s

1920s

1930s

1940s

1960s

1970s

1980s

1990s

2000s

2010s

2020s

See also
Lists of people who disappeared

References

Fugitives